Schadenberg’s burrowing skink (Brachymeles schadenbergi) is a species of skink endemic to the Philippines.

References

Reptiles of the Philippines
Reptiles described in 1885
Brachymeles
Taxa named by Johann Gustav Fischer